Alpheus Jones House, also known as Seth Jones 1847 Restaurant, is a historic home located near Raleigh, Wake County, North Carolina.  It was built in 1847, and is a two-story, rectangular, vernacular Greek Revival-style frame dwelling with a hipped roof. It is sheathed in weatherboard, sits on an ashlar foundation, and has a rear extension and kitchen wing.  The front facade features a reconstructed two-story double Doric order portico. The house was restored in 1968, and renovated to house a restaurant.

It was listed on the National Register of Historic Places in 1975.

References

Houses on the National Register of Historic Places in North Carolina
Greek Revival houses in North Carolina
Houses completed in 1847
Houses in Wake County, North Carolina
National Register of Historic Places in Wake County, North Carolina
1847 establishments in North Carolina